Dharanidhar Medical College and Hospital (DMCH), Keonjhar, formerly known as Government Medical College and Hospital, Keonjhar, is a full-fledged tertiary government medical college and hospital. It is located at Keonjhar district, Odisha. The college imparts the degree Bachelor of Medicine and Bachelor of Surgery (MBBS) as well as specialized degrees. The hospital associated with the college is one of the largest hospitals in the Keonjhar district. Selection to the college is done on the basis of merit through the National Eligibility and Entrance Test. The yearly undergraduate student intake is 100.

Courses
Dharanidhar Medical College and Hospital, Keonjhar, Odisha undertakes education and training of students in MBBS courses.

Affiliations
The college is affiliated with the Dharanidhar University and is recognized by the National Medical Commission.

References

Medical colleges in Odisha
Universities and colleges in Odisha
Educational institutions established in 2022
2022 establishments in Odisha